The Melozitna River is a  tributary of the Yukon River in the U.S. state of Alaska. It flows generally southwest from the Ray Mountains to its mouth near the city of Ruby.

Boating
It is possible to run the Melozitna in many kinds of non-motorized boats. Most of the river is slow-moving and meandering, rated Class I (easy) on the International Scale of River Difficulty. The exception occurs in the  Melozitna Canyon on the lower river, where a  series of rapids may require portaging. This part of the river is rated Class II (medium) to Class IV (very difficult).

Dangers include high populations of grizzly bears along the middle reaches of the river and black bears along the lower reaches. The canyon portage can be difficult.

Melozitna Hot Springs 
Melozitna Hot Springs or Melozi Hot Springs is a mineral hot spring destination located on a tributary of the Melozitna River, known as the Big Melozi.  The hot springs is located  about 10 miles from the main river.  The hot springs are about 16 miles north of the Yukon River 30 miles below Tanana. 
Melozi Hot Springs is in the course of Hot Springs Creek, 3.5 miles E of its mouth, 26 mi. NNW of Hochandochtia Mtn., Kokrine-Hodzana High.; 65"54'30" N, 154"50'30" W.  The local name was reported by the USGS in 1954.

History 
A two-room cabin and a dog house were built on the gravel bank near the springs. Two small log bathhouses, possibly built earlier on each side of the springs, had wooden tubs and sweat chambers and were in operation in 1911. The bathhouses were used in winter by both whites and natives but less in the summer due to having difficult summer trails. The analysis of the water in 1915 showed clear dark water similar to black sulfur waters. In 1915, the Kokrines supported the Hub Roadhouse, a small trading point and post office on the north side of the Yukon River. The distance from there was about 16 miles.

See also
List of rivers of Alaska

References

Rivers of Yukon–Koyukuk Census Area, Alaska
Rivers of Alaska
Tributaries of the Yukon River
Hot springs of Alaska
Rivers of Unorganized Borough, Alaska